Wolfram Mathematica is a software system with built-in libraries for several areas of technical computing that allow machine learning, statistics, symbolic computation, data manipulation, network analysis, time series analysis, NLP, optimization, plotting functions and various types of data, implementation of algorithms, creation of user interfaces, and interfacing with programs written in other programming languages. It was conceived by Stephen Wolfram, and is developed by Wolfram Research of Champaign, Illinois. The Wolfram Language is the programming language used in Mathematica. Mathematica 1.0 was released on June 23, 1988 in Champaign, Illinois and Santa Clara, California. 



Notebook interface
Mathematica is split into two parts: the kernel and the front end. The kernel interprets expressions (Wolfram Language code) and returns result expressions, which can then be displayed by the front end.

The original front end, designed by Theodore Gray in 1988, consists of a notebook interface and allows the creation and editing of notebook documents that can contain code, plaintext, images, and graphics.

Alternatives to the Mathematica front end include Wolfram Workbench—an Eclipse-based integrated development environment (IDE) that was introduced in 2006. It provides project-based code development tools for Mathematica, including revision management, debugging, profiling, and testing.

There is also a plugin for IntelliJ IDEA-based IDEs to work with Wolfram Language code that in addition to syntax highlighting can analyze and auto-complete local variables and defined functions. The Mathematica Kernel also includes a command line front end.

Other interfaces include JMath, based on GNU Readline and WolframScript which runs self-contained Mathematica programs (with arguments) from the UNIX command line.

The file extension for Mathematica files is .nb and .m for configuration files.

Mathematica is designed to be fully stable and backwards compatible with previous versions.

High-performance computing 

Capabilities for high-performance computing were extended with the introduction of packed arrays in version 4 (1999) and sparse matrices (version 5, 2003), and by adopting the GNU Multi-Precision Library to evaluate high-precision arithmetic.

Version 5.2 (2005) added automatic multi-threading when computations are performed on multi-core computers. This release included CPU-specific optimized libraries. In addition Mathematica is supported by third party specialist acceleration hardware such as ClearSpeed.

In 2002, gridMathematica was introduced to allow user level parallel programming on heterogeneous clusters and multiprocessor systems and in 2008 parallel computing technology was included in all Mathematica licenses including support for grid technology such as Windows HPC Server 2008, Microsoft Compute Cluster Server and Sun Grid.

Support for CUDA and OpenCL GPU hardware was added in 2010.

Extensions 
As of Version 13, there are 6,051 built-in functions and symbols in the Wolfram Language. Stephen Wolfram announced the launch of the Wolfram Function Repository in June 2019 as a way for the public Wolfram community to contribute functionality to the Wolfram Language. At the time of Stephen Wolfram's release announcement for Mathematica 13, there were 2,259 functions contributed as Resource Functions. In addition to the Wolfram Function Repository, there is a Wolfram Data Repository with computable data and the Wolfram Neural Net Repository for machine learning.

Wolfram Mathematica is the basis of the Combinatorica package, which adds discrete mathematics functionality in combinatorics and graph theory to the program.

Connections to other applications, programming languages, and services
Communication with other applications can be done using a protocol called Wolfram Symbolic Transfer Protocol (WSTP). It allows communication between the Wolfram Mathematica kernel and the front end and provides a general interface between the kernel and other applications.

Wolfram Research freely distributes a developer kit for linking applications written in the programming language C to the Mathematica kernel through WSTP using J/Link., a Java program that can ask Mathematica to perform computations. Similar functionality is achieved with .NET /Link, but with .NET programs instead of Java programs.

Other languages that connect to Mathematica include Haskell, AppleScript, Racket, Visual Basic, Python, and Clojure.

Mathematica supports the generation and execution of Modelica models for systems modeling and connects with Wolfram System Modeler.

Links are also available to many third-party software packages and APIs.

Mathematica can also capture real-time data from a variety of sources and can read and write to public blockchains (Bitcoin, Ethereum, and ARK).

It supports import and export of over 220 data, image, video, sound, computer-aided design (CAD), geographic information systems (GIS), document, and biomedical formats.

In 2019, support was added for compiling Wolfram Language code to LLVM.

Version 12.3 of the Wolfram Language added support for Arduino.

Computable data 
Mathematica is also integrated with Wolfram Alpha, an online answer engine that provides additional data, some of which is kept updated in real time, for users who use Mathematica with an internet connection. Some of the data sets include astronomical, chemical, geopolitical, language, biomedical, airplane, and weather data, in addition to mathematical data (such as knots and polyhedra).

Reception 
BYTE in 1989 listed Mathematica as among the "Distinction" winners of the BYTE Awards, stating that it "is another breakthrough Macintosh application ... it could enable you to absorb the algebra and calculus that seemed impossible to comprehend from a textbook". Mathematica has been criticized for being closed source. Wolfram Research claims keeping Mathematica closed source is central to its business model and the continuity of the software.

See also 

Comparison of multi-paradigm programming languages
Comparison of numerical-analysis software
Comparison of programming languages
Comparison of regular expression engines
Computational X
Dynamic programming language
Fourth-generation programming language
Functional programming
List of computer algebra systems
List of computer simulation software
List of information graphics software
Literate programming
Mathematical markup language
Mathematical software
WolframAlpha, a web answer engine
Wolfram Language
Wolfram SystemModeler, a physical modeling and simulation tool which integrates with Mathematica
SageMath

References

External links 

Mathematica Documentation Center
A little bit of Mathematica history documenting the growth of code base and number of functions over time

1988 software
Astronomical databases
Notebook interface
Computer algebra system software for Linux
Computer algebra system software for macOS
Computer algebra system software for Windows
Computer algebra systems
Cross-platform software
Data mining and machine learning software
Earth sciences graphics software
Econometrics software
Formula editors
Interactive geometry software
Mathematical optimization software
Mathematical software
Numerical analysis software for Linux
Numerical analysis software for macOS
Numerical analysis software for Windows
Numerical programming languages
Numerical software
Physics software
Pi-related software
Plotting software
Proprietary commercial software for Linux
Proprietary cross-platform software
Proprietary software that uses Qt
Regression and curve fitting software
Simulation programming languages
Software that uses Qt
Statistical programming languages
Theorem proving software systems
Time series software
Wolfram Research
Graph drawing software